The 2018–19 KNVB Cup, for sponsoring reasons officially called the TOTO KNVB Cup, was the 101st season of the annual Dutch national football cup competition. It commenced on 18 August 2018 with the first of two preliminary rounds and concluded on 5 May 2019 with the final played at De Kuip in Rotterdam.

The defending champions were Feyenoord from the Eredivisie, who beat AZ 3–0 in the final in the previous season on 30 April 2018. They were eliminated by Ajax in the semi-finals.

Ajax as the winners participated in the 2019 Johan Cruyff Shield against PSV Eindhoven.

Schedule

Matches

Preliminary rounds 
The draw for the preliminary rounds were performed by Ridgeciano Haps on 7 July 2018 and was streamed live on the website of the KNVB.

First preliminary round 
58 amateur teams qualified for this stage, although 26 received a bye to the next round, leaving 32 teams to compete for a spot in the second preliminary round. The participants are semi-finalists from the district cup tournaments, and teams from the Derde Divisie.

Second preliminary round 
In the second preliminary round, 54 amateur teams played. The participants were the 16 winners of the first preliminary round, 26 teams that were given a bye in the first preliminary round, and 12 teams from the Tweede Divisie. The matches were played on 18, 21, 22, and 25 August 2018.

Main tournament 
There are 64 teams going into the main tournament: 27 winners from the preliminary rounds, 34 professional teams, and three (replacement) period champions from the Tweede Divisie.

First round

Second round 
The draw for the second round was performed on 29 September 2018 at 23:00 CEST.
The matches of the second round took place between 30 October and 1 November 2018.

Round of 16 
The draw for the round of 16 took place on 3 November 2018 at 23:00 CET. The matches of the round of 16 took place between 18 and 20 December 2018.

Quarter-finals 
The draw for the quarter-finals took place on 22 December 2018 at 23:00 CET. The matches of the quarter-finals took place between 22 and 24 January 2019. From this round on the referees are assisted by video assistant referee.

Semi-finals 
The semi-finals took place on 27 and 28 February 2019.

Final

References

2018–19
Netherlands
KNVB